Jude St. John (born December 4, 1972) is a former Canadian football guard who played in the Canadian Football League.

External links
Toronto Argonauts profile
Official website

1972 births
Living people
Canadian football offensive linemen
Hamilton Tiger-Cats players
Sportspeople from London, Ontario
Players of Canadian football from Ontario
Toronto Argonauts players
Western Mustangs football players